Passiflora deltoifolia is a species of plant in the family Passifloraceae. It is endemic to Ecuador.

References

deltoifolia
Endemic flora of Ecuador
Vulnerable plants
Taxonomy articles created by Polbot